Emzini Wezinsizwa  is a sitcom that was broadcast on SABC1 in South Africa between 1994 and 2004. It starred Roland Mqwebu, Jabulani Nkosi, Jerry Phele, Shadrack Ngema and Vusi Thanda.

Plot
The sitcom is about the antics of five adult males who move to a Johannesburg hostel compound to earn a living. They live in Room 8 - the most controversial and popular room of the hostel - and always find themselves on the wrong side of the hostel's authorities.

The show ended in August 2003 after three starring actors Mqwebu, Nkosi and Phele were fired for high salary demands and being "rebellious". They were later replaced by Siyabonga Twala, Siphiwe Nkosi and Augustine Shitolo for the next season of 26 episodes which started on 15 December 2003. The new series was met with negative remarks. South African musician and notable viewer of the sitcom Jabu Khanyile made it clear that he preferred the original characters and that the new series was "nonsense".

Characters
Roland Mqwebu as James Mkhize Khabazela, Gubhela kaMavovo – a Zulu-speaking boom gate watchman, a polygamous iNduna (tribal chief) and barber from Mtubatuba.
Shadrack Ngema as Magubane – a Zulu-speaking Post Office messenger and iNyanga (resident traditional healer) from KwaMaphumulo.
Jabulani Nkosi as Benson Chirwali – a Fanagalo-speaking Malawian tailor from Blantyre, Malawi.
Vusi Thanda as Moses Tshawe – a Xhosa–speaking construction site foreman from Mthatha.
Jerry Phele as Thabang Mofokeng – an unemployed, Sesotho-speaking impulsive gambler and ladies man from Phuthaditjhaba Qwaqwa in the Free State.
Nyembezi Kunene as Mchunu – senior hostel security guard and was called macingwana(clan names).
Bafana Mlangeni as Sibeko – a rude, rowdy drunkard and spy.
Washington Sixolo as Jwara.
Maxwell Mlilo as Ngconde - Tshawe's relative and best friend.

References

1994 South African television series debuts
Television shows set in South Africa
South African television sitcoms
SABC 1 original programming